Walter Edward Williams (March 31, 1936December 1, 2020) was an American economist, commentator, and academic. Williams was the John M. Olin Distinguished Professor of Economics at George Mason University, as well as a syndicated columnist and author. Known for his classical liberal and libertarian views, Williams's writings frequently appeared in Townhall, WND, and Jewish World Review. Williams was also a popular guest host of the Rush Limbaugh radio show when Limbaugh was unavailable.

Early life and education 
Williams was born in Philadelphia on March 31, 1936. His family during childhood consisted of his mother, his sister, and him; Williams's father played no role in raising Williams or his sister. The family initially lived in West Philadelphia, moving to North Philadelphia and the Richard Allen housing projects when Williams was ten years old.  His neighbors included a young Bill Cosby. Williams knew many of the individuals that Cosby speaks of from his childhood, including Weird Harold and Fat Albert.

After graduating from Benjamin Franklin High School, Williams traveled to California to live with his father and attend Los Angeles City College for one semester. He later returned to Philadelphia and secured a job as a cab driver for the Yellow Cab Company. In 1959, he was drafted into the military and served as a private in the United States Army.

While stationed in the South, Williams "waged a one-man battle against Jim Crow from inside the army." He challenged the racial order with provocative statements to his fellow soldiers. This resulted in an overseeing officer filing a court-martial proceeding against Williams.  Williams argued his own case and was found not guilty. While considering filing countercharges against the officer who had brought him up for court martial, Williams found himself transferred to Korea. Upon arriving there, Williams marked "Caucasian" for race on his personnel form.  When challenged on this, Williams replied wryly if he had marked "Black," he would end up getting all the worst jobs. From Korea, Williams wrote a letter to President John F. Kennedy denouncing the pervasive racism in the American government and military and questioning the actions black Americans should take given the state of affairs, writing:

He received a reply from the Deputy Assistant Secretary of Defense, Alfred B. Fitt, a response which he termed "the most reasonable response that I received from any official."

Following his military service, Williams served as a juvenile group supervisor for the Los Angeles County Probation Department from 1963 to 1967. Williams also resumed his education, earning a bachelor's degree in economics in 1965 from California State College at Los Angeles (now Cal State Los Angeles). He earned both his master's degree and his PhD in economics from the University of California, Los Angeles (UCLA). Williams's doctoral thesis was titled The Low-Income Market Place.

Speaking of his early college days, Williams said: "I was more than anything a radical. I was more sympathetic to Malcolm X than Martin Luther King, because Malcolm X was more of a radical who was willing to confront discrimination in ways that I thought it should be confronted, including perhaps the use of violence.  But I really just wanted to be left alone. I thought some laws, like minimum-wage laws, helped poor people and poor black people and protected workers from exploitation. I thought they were a good thing until I was pressed by professors to look at the evidence." During his time at UCLA, Williams came into contact with economists such as Armen Alchian, James M. Buchanan, and Axel Leijonhufvud who challenged his assumptions.

While Williams was attending UCLA, Thomas Sowell arrived on campus in 1969 as a visiting professor. Although he never took a class from Dr. Sowell, the two met and began a friendship that lasted for decades. In the summer of 1972, Sowell was hired as director of the Urban Institute's Ethnic Minorities Project, which Williams joined shortly thereafter. Correspondence between Sowell and Williams appears in "A Man of Letters," a 2007 autobiography authored by Sowell.

Academic career 
During his doctoral studies, Williams was an instructor in economics at Los Angeles City College from 1967 to 1969, and at Cal State Los Angeles from 1967 to 1971.

After returning to his native Philadelphia, Williams taught economics at Temple University from 1973 to 1980. For the 1975–76 academic year, Williams was a visiting scholar at the Hoover Institution at Stanford University. In 1980, Williams joined the economics faculty at George Mason University in Fairfax, Virginia. That same year, Williams began writing a syndicated column, "A Minority View", for Heritage Features Syndicate, which merged with Creators Syndicate in 1991. From 1995 to 2001, Williams chaired the economics department at George Mason. Courses taught by Williams at George Mason include "Intermediate Microeconomics" for undergraduate students and "Microeconomic Theory I" for graduate students. Williams continued to teach at George Mason until his death in 2020.

In his nearly fifty-year career, Williams wrote hundreds of research articles, book reviews, and commentaries for scholarly journals including American Economic Review, Policy Review, and Journal of Labor Research as well as popular journals including The American Spectator, Newsweek, Reason, and The Wall Street Journal.

Williams was awarded an honorary degree at Universidad Francisco Marroquín. He served on advisory boards including the Review Board of Economics Studies for the National Science Foundation, Reason Foundation, the National Tax Limitation Committee, and the Hoover Institute.

Williams wrote ten books, beginning in 1982 with The State Against Blacks and America: A Minority Viewpoint. He wrote and hosted documentaries for PBS in 1985. The "Good Intentions" documentary was based on his book The State Against Blacks.

Economic and political views 
As an economist, Williams was a proponent of free market economics and opposed socialist systems of government intervention. Williams believed laissez-faire capitalism to be the most moral, most productive system humans have ever devised.

In the mid-to-late 1970s, Williams conducted research into the Davis–Bacon Act of 1931 and on the impact of minimum wage laws on minority employment. His research led him to conclude the government's interventional programs are harmful. Williams was critical of state programs, including minimum wage and affirmative action laws, stating both practices inhibit liberty and are detrimental to the blacks they are intended to help. He published his results in his 1982 book The State Against Blacks, where he argued that laws regulating economic activity are far greater obstacles to economic progress for blacks than racial bigotry and discrimination. Subsequently, Williams spoke on the topic and penned a number of articles detailing his view that increases in the minimum wage price low skill workers out of the market, eliminating their opportunities for employment.

Williams believed that racism and the legacy of slavery in the United States are overemphasized as problems faced by the black community today. He pointed to the crippling effects of a welfare state and the disintegration of the black family as more pressing concerns. "The welfare state has done to black Americans what slavery couldn't do, and that is to destroy the black family." Although in favor of equal access to government institutions such as court houses, city halls, and libraries, Williams opposed anti-discrimination laws directed at the private sector on the grounds that such laws infringe upon the people's right of freedom of association.

Williams viewed gun control laws as a governmental infringement upon the rights of individuals, and argued that they end up endangering the innocent while failing to reduce crime. Williams also made the argument that the true proof of whether or not an individual owns something is whether or not they have the right to sell it. Taking this argument to its conclusion, he supported legalization of selling one's own bodily organs.  He argued that government prohibiting the selling of one's bodily organs is an infringement upon one's property rights.

Williams praised the views of Thomas DiLorenzo, and wrote a foreword to DiLorenzo's anti-Abraham Lincoln book, The Real Lincoln. Williams maintained that the American states are entitled to secede from the union if they wish, as the Confederate states attempted to do during the Civil War, and asserted that the Union's victory in the Civil War allowed the federal government "to run amok over states' rights, so much so that the protections of the Ninth and Tenth Amendments mean little or nothing today."

In reaction to what he viewed as inappropriate racial sensitivity that he saw hurting blacks in higher education, Williams began in the 1970s to offer colleagues a "certificate of amnesty and pardon" to all white people for Western Civilization's sins against blacks – and "thus obliged them not to act like damn fools in their relationships with Americans of African ancestry." It is still offered to anyone. The certificate can be obtained at his website.

Williams was opposed to the Federal Reserve System, arguing that central banks are dangerous.

In his autobiography, Williams cited Frederick Bastiat, Ludwig von Mises, Friedrich Hayek, and Milton Friedman as influences that led him to become a libertarian. Williams praised Ayn Rand's Capitalism: The Unknown Ideal as "one of the best defenses and explanations of capitalism one is likely to read."

Aside from authoring his weekly columns, Williams was a frequent guest host for Rush Limbaugh's radio program when Limbaugh was away traveling. In 2009, Greg Ransom, a writer for the Ludwig von Mises Institute, ranked Williams as the third-most important "Hayekian" Public Intellectual in America, behind only Thomas Sowell and John Stossel. Reason called Williams "one of the country's leading libertarian voices."

Personal life and death 
Williams lived in Devon, Pennsylvania, since 1973. He was married to Connie (née Taylor) from 1960 until her death in 2007. They had one daughter, Devyn. When he began teaching at George Mason, he rented a cheap hotel room in Fairfax, Virginia, where he lived from Tuesdays through Thursdays around his teaching schedule. Williams was a cousin of former NBA player Julius Erving.

Williams served on the board of directors of Media General, parent company of the Richmond Times-Dispatch, from 2001 until his retirement from the board in 2011. He was also chairman of the company's audit committee.

Williams died in his car on December 1, 2020, at age 84, shortly after teaching a class at George Mason University. His daughter said that he suffered from chronic obstructive pulmonary disease and hypertension. Shortly before his death, Williams was featured in the documentary, Uncle Tom, where he provided commentary on conservatism within the black community and discussed his own perspective as a black conservative.

Bibliography

Filmography 
  (1982), a documentary based on Williams' The State Against Blacks.
 Suffer No Fools (2015), a biography examining Williams' life and work.
 Uncle Tom (2020), Williams appeared as himself in the documentary Uncle Tom, which documents the perspective of conservative black Americans.

See also 
 Black conservatism in the United States
 Libertarian conservatism
 List of economists

References

External links 

 economics.gmu.edu/people/wwilliam — Walter E. Williams faculty page at George Mason University
 "The E Stands for Excellence": A Tribute to Walter E. Williams, Mises Institute obituary
 Walter Williams: Steadfast Scholar, Missionary of Freedom, Foundation for Economic Education obituary

Text 
 Walter Williams official website
 Walter Williams Features at Creators Syndicate

Audio 
 
 Audio interview with Walter E. Williams at National Review Online

Video 
 

1936 births
2020 deaths
20th-century American male writers
20th-century American non-fiction writers
21st-century American journalists
21st-century American male writers
21st-century American non-fiction writers
African-American economists
American columnists
American economics writers
American libertarians
American male journalists
American political commentators
American political journalists
American political writers
American talk radio hosts
Black conservatism in the United States
California State University, Los Angeles alumni
California State University, Los Angeles faculty
Economists from Pennsylvania
George Mason University faculty
Grove City College
Journalists from California
Libertarian economists
Military personnel from Philadelphia
American opinion journalists
People from Chester County, Pennsylvania
Temple University faculty
The Rush Limbaugh Show
United States Army soldiers
University of California, Los Angeles alumni
Writers from Philadelphia
20th-century African-American writers
21st-century African-American people
Member of the Mont Pelerin Society